Anti-Monopoly is a board game made by San Francisco State University Professor Ralph Anspach in response to Monopoly. The idea of an anti-monopoly board game dates to 1903 when Lizzie Magie created The Landlord's Game.

Background and history 
Anspach created Anti-Monopoly in part as a response to the lessons taught by the mainstream game, which he believed created the impression that monopolies were something desirable.  His intent was to demonstrate how harmful monopolies could be to a free-enterprise system, and how antitrust laws work to curtail them in the real world.

The game was originally to be produced in 1973 as Bust the Trust, but the title was changed to Anti-Monopoly. It has seen multiple printings and revisions since 1973. In 1984, a new version appeared as Anti-Monopoly II; this version was updated and re-released in 2005 without the numerical designation. The game is currently still in print, and is produced and distributed worldwide by University Games.

Gameplay
The original Anti-Monopoly game begins with the board in a monopolised state, effectively the result of a completed Monopoly game.  Instead of real estate and public utilities, properties in Anti-Monopoly are individual businesses that have been brought under single ownership.  Players take the role of federal case workers bringing indictments against each monopolised business in an attempt to return the state of the board to a free market system.

In Anti-Monopoly II individual players choose to play either by monopolist or competitor rules at the beginning of the game. This version plays more like the actual Monopoly game in that it is based on the buying and selling of real estate. Among other differences, competitors charge lower rents and can improve any property they own at any time, while monopolists must own at least two properties in a group before building houses on them and charge much higher rents.

Trademark lawsuit

In 1974, Parker Brothers sued Anspach over the use of the "Monopoly" name, claiming trademark infringement.  While preparing his legal defense, Anspach became aware of Monopolys history prior to Charles Darrow's sale of the game to Parker in 1935, and how it had evolved from Elizabeth Magie's original Landlord's Game into the version Darrow appropriated.  Anspach based his defense on the grounds that the game itself existed in effectively the public domain before Parker purchased it, and therefore Parker's trademark claim on it should be nullified.  The case dragged on for ten years, with numerous appeals and overturned judicial verdicts, until Anspach and Parker ultimately reached a settlement, permitting him to continue using the name Anti-Monopoly and distributing the game.

For a time during the dispute, the game was marketed as simply "Anti."

Related games
  Syndrome, a similar game in that it inverts the objective of Monopoly but with the aim of giving away money and property, was described by science fiction author Philip K. Dick in his short story "War Game". Selchow and Righter published the game as Go for Broke in 1965.
 Class Struggle, a board game based on Marxism, created by Bertell Ollman
 In Germany, where the original game was and still is very popular, two more versions of Anti-Monopoly were created and popular in the late 1970s and 1980s: Provopoli - Wem gehört die Stadt  ("To whom the city belongs"), where squatters take over parts of the town, and Ökopoli ("Ecopoly") where the objective is to take over the town from polluters.

Reviews
Jeux & Stratégie #27

See also
History of the board game Monopoly

References

External links
 
 Anti-Monopoly on University Games' website
 Go to Court, Go Directly to Court - article from the Washington Free Press
 How a Fight Over a Board Game Monopolized an Economist's Life, The Wall Street Journal

Board games introduced in 1973
Monopoly (game)
Economic simulation board games
Satirical games